Susan Kathryn Lalic (née Walker; born 28 October 1965) is an English chess player, holding both International Master (IM) and Woman Grandmaster (WGM) titles. She is five-time British Women's Chess Champion: 1986, 1990–1992, and 1998.

Lalic has played for England nine times in Chess Olympiads, from 1984 to 2000, inclusive. From 1986 to 1998, she played on the top board.

She was the Fifth Women's Commonwealth Champion in 1987, the contest having been incorporated into the Lloyd's Bank Congress of that year.

Lalic was educated at Nonsuch High School for Girls from 1977 to 1984, and has been married in the past to Keith Arkell and then to Bogdan Lalić. Currently she is married to International Master Graeme Buckley.

See also
 List of female chess players

References

External links

Susan Lalic chess games at 365Chess.com
Susan Walker chess games at 365Chess.com

1965 births
Living people
Chess International Masters
Chess woman grandmasters
English female chess players
People educated at Nonsuch High School